Francis Michael Durango Magalona (October 4, 1964 – March 6, 2009), also known by the moniker Francis M, was a Filipino rapper, singer, songwriter, entrepreneur, actor, and television personality. Born in Manila, He became a significant influence to artists in the Pinoy hip-hop scene and the local rap community.

Beyond music, Magalona was also a television host on MTV Asia and Channel V Philippines and on the noontime variety television show Eat Bulaga!. Magalona died on March 6, 2009, seven months after being diagnosed with acute myelogenous leukemia. Magalona was later awarded a posthumous Presidential Medal of Merit. The award's citation noted that it had been given "for his musical and artistic brilliance, his deep faith in the Filipino and his sense of national pride that continue to inspire us."

Family and early career
Magalona was the eighth of the nine children of actors Pancho Magalona and Tita Duran, popular film stars of the 1940s and 1950s. His grandfather, Enrique B. Magalona, was a politician and served as a Senator of the Philippines from 1946 to 1949 and from 1949 to 1955. He graduated from high school at the Don Bosco Technical College in Mandaluyong from 1978 to 1981 and studied at the San Beda College in Manila from 1981 to 1984.

Magalona started out as a breakdancer in the 1980s. He was cast in several Filipino movies including Bagets 2. He was the resident DJ/rapper in the IBC-13 variety show Loveli'Ness.

Magalona was introduced by co-actor Richard Gomez to Pia Arroyo at a party in a disco owned by film director Ishmael Bernal, and the couple got married in 1985. The couple had eight children, two of whom were Magalona's stepchildren: Unna, Nicolo, and television personalities Maxene (Max) (1986), Francis Jr. (Frank) (1987), Saab (1988), Elmo (1994), Arkin and Clara Magalona, who entered showbiz to follow their father's footsteps. 

Magalona was also a second cousin of Cacai and Regine Velasquez through his mother whose first cousin was Gerardo Velasquez.

Music career

Filipino hip hop and nationalistic rap
In 1990, he released the album Yo!, the first commercially released Filipino rap album. Yo! included several popular singles such as "Mga Kababayan" (Fellow Countrymen), "Gotta Let 'Cha Know", "Cold Summer Nights", and a duet with Pia Arroyo "Loving You" as the only song that Pia recorded. With tracks that featured politically conscious and thought-provoking rhymes in both English and Tagalog, Yo! was a big success and helped catapult Filipino hip hop from underground to mainstream status. It also marked the birth of Makabayang (nationalistic) rap in Filipino hip hop.

In 1992, Francis Magalona released Rap Is FrancisM (1992). With tracks addressing the various cultural and social problems that plagued his country such as drug addiction in "Mga Praning" (Paranoids), political instability in "Halalan" (Elections) as well as the detrimental effects of a colonial mentality in "Tayo'y Mga Pinoy" (We Are Filipinos), the record's complexity and conscious message quickly earned it its classic status and became the standard by which future albums of the genre were to be compared. This album helped tag Magalona as one of the most politically conscious voices of his generation.

Hardware Syndrome and the merging of rap with Pinoy rock
The release of his third album, Meron akong ano! (I Got Something!) in 1993 marked the beginning of Magalona's experimentation with Pinoy rock. It also saw the birth of Hardware Syndrome—previously known as Cannabis—the band that would, with Magalona at its helm, introduce the merging of Pinoy rock and rap to the Filipino music audience. Members over the years included musicians Carlo Sison, Francis Villanueva, Niño Mesina, Boyet Aquino, Elmer Blancaflor, Noel Mendez, Perf de Castro, Benjie "Bagets" Mendez, Albert Tamayo, DJ Kimozave, DJ Radikal MK, Kenji Marquez, Jack Rufo, and Wendell Garcia.

Magalona was soon cited for excellence in both genres of music. He collaborated with other notable OPM artists including Andrew E., Joey Ayala, Heber Bartolome of Banyuhay, Ryan Cayabyab, Mike Hanopol of Juan Dela Cruz Band, Michael V., Death Threat, and the band Eraserheads. In the latter part of his career, Magalona worked together with rappers Pikaso, Gloc 9 and the Pinoy rock band Parokya ni Edgar. In 1994, Magalona moved from Octo-Arts EMI Philippines, which had released all of his previous albums, to BMG Records (Pilipinas) Inc. with Musiko Records (is a wholly owned of sub-labels of a BMG Records (Pilipinas) Inc.), the same label as the seminal Pinoy rock group, The Eraserheads.

Freeman was released the following year, 1995, and firmly established Magalona's legitimacy in the Pinoy rock scene. Tracks such as "Three Stars & A Sun", "Kabataan Para Sa Kinabukasan" (Children For The Future), "Suckin' on Helium/Kaleidoscope World" would become defining touchpoints in Magalona's body of work. A track titled "Intellectual Property Rights" would sample a speech by then-president Fidel V. Ramos. Intellectual property rights was an issue that would continue to be an important and very personal advocacy for Magalona. "Kaleidoscope World" went on to win 1996 Awit Award for Best Produced Record of the Year, and the 1996 NU 107 Rock Award for Song of the Year. Its music video was directed by the celebrated director/cinematographer Raymond Red

Magalona's next album, Happy Battle, was released in 1996. The launch for the video-game themed album at the Hard Rock Cafe in Makati was noted by the press for its wide range of influences: aside from fans of Magalona's music, he had showbiz fans and coworkers from Eat Bulaga!, where he had already started hosting; and two sets of Sony PlayStations with giant screens set up so people could play video games while watching the gig. The album was also notable for a number of significant collaborations: "Unstrung Heroes" with Ely Buendia; "Sapot" (Web) with project band Planet Garapata, which included Raimund Marasigan, Jeng Tan, and Mark Lakay, who would later form Sandwich; and "Make Your Move" with pioneer Filipino punk band Betrayed. In keeping with the nationalistic theme in Magalona's work, 1-800-Ninety-Six was written in celebration of the centennial of the Philippine revolution of 1896. "Rainy" won Best Folk song, and the album itself would become the only album to win Best Rock and Best Rap Album at the Katha Awards. When Magalona was diagnosed with leukemia, he and his wife Pia would use the album name "Happy Battle" as a reference to his fight against cancer.

Later albums with Sony Music
The 1998 album The Oddventures of Mr. Cool saw a move from the last two albums' heavy guitar sound and explored mellow, urban-style rapping. It featured the song "Whole Lotta Lovin'", whose music is a sample of the Eraserheads song "Alapaap" (Heaven).

Later albums with BMG (now with Sony Music) would include Interscholastic (1999), which featured adaptations of various artists' songs; and Freeman 2 (2000), which would echo many of the themes that had made the first Freeman album so popular. In 2002, his greatest hits album The Best of FrancisM was released by Musiko Records and BMG Records (Pilipinas) Inc. 2004 in turn saw the release of a single titled "Pambihira Ka" (You're Remarkable).

Independent projects
In 2002, with the assistance of then FUBU Philippines' management employees Carlo Maniquiz and Nick Tuason, Magalona launched a compilation album of the same name.

Magalona founded his own record company called Red Egg Records, and a production company, Filipino Pictures Inc., where he served as the resident director. Through his production company, Magalona produced and directed music videos for several bands and solo artists such as Ely Buendia. His work on Sponge Cola's "KLSP" won Best Rock Video at the 2006 MYX Video Awards.

Shortly before his death, Magalona collaborated with Ely Buendia and other Filipino artists on an album with the working title The Sickos Project, which was later named as "In Love and War", and released posthumously. Both Francis M. and Ely Buendia were having health problems at that time. The album's carrier single is "Higante" (Giant), which is about illness and strengths. Its music video was released in September 2009.

In an interview, Ely Buendia described himself as a "ticking timebomb" and Francis Magalona as "on borrowed time." The album will include a documentary about Ely and Francis, shot by Magalona's very own production company Filipino Pictures.

Television career
In addition to co-hosting LoveliNess, Magalona was one of the original members of the youth oriented show That's Entertainment in 1987. He was also a co-host of the Philippine noontime variety show Eat Bulaga! as well as being a VJ for MTV Asia and Channel V. He was MTV Asia's first Filipino VJ and remained with the network from 1996 to 2000.

He was also known for starring in the second installment of Bagets. In 1997, Magalona played the lead role in the made-for-TV movie Kamada by Raymond Red. The film, a full-length feature shot on 16 mm, received awards from The Philippines Broadcasting Television and Asian TV Awards during the same year.

He was also chosen by Fremantle Media, owners of American Idol as one of the judges of in the first Philippine Idol season that aired on ABC (now TV5). Magalona and his fellow judges Ryan Cayabyab and Pilita Corrales were not retained when the franchise transferred to GMA Network in 2008 with a different title: Pinoy Idol. Aside from television, he also hosted live events and presentations.

Other endeavors

Magalona was a photographer and submitted pictures to magazines for publication. News reports note that he was overjoyed when he was accepted as a member of the Camera Club of the Philippines, and eventually received critical acclaim for his photographs.

Magalona also established a clothing line named FMCC, which stood for "FrancisM Clothing Co." FMCC is sold in stores called "3 Stars & A Sun."

He also started a foundation with Ely Buendia called Heartist Foundation, which aims to help Filipino artists with health and commercial concerns.

Illness and death
Magalona was diagnosed with acute myeloid leukemia on August 8, 2008 at the Medical City Hospital, Pasig. Appealing to the media and the public, Magalona said: 

After his first treatment and discharge, he made his return on Eat Bulaga together with Ely Buendia, who had also been recently discharged. His daughter Maxene stated that "He always did what he wanted to do. He never let anyone or anything stop him from doing what he loved to do. He still went to the Camera Club, he still took pictures, every time he was discharged from the hospital, he recorded songs with Ely Buendia. He taught us that life is short but it can be well lived. Don't waste your time in the world."

His wife, Pia, later described her husband's battle with the disease, saying "Francis was a very passionate person. When he was angry, he was very expressive. He would get angry with his cancer. That was his way of coping with it. But he didn't give up. I remembered that he told me, 'I'm going down fighting.'"

On March 6, 2009, at 12 noon, Magalona succumbed to multiple organ failure secondary to septic shock, secondary to pneumonia in the immunocompromised (immediate cause); acute respiratory failure secondary to acute respiratory distress syndrome (antecedent cause); underlying cause: Chronic myelogenous leukemia blast crisis. He had undergone several chemotherapy sessions since he was diagnosed the previous year and had been expected to undergo a bone marrow transplantation (BMT) and peripheral blood stem cell transplantation (PBSCT).

The announcement was first made over Eat Bulaga!. News of his death sparked a surge of web traffic to several Philippine news sites, causing a momentary slowdown in their operation. Guests at his wake included former president Corazon Aquino, (who also died five months after Magalona's passing) along with other politicians and artists who paid tribute to Magalona's contribution to Filipino music and to national pride – the dominant advocacy theme in FrancisM's music. Fans arrived in droves to pay their last respects, some of them making a point to wear shirts from Magalona's FMCC line. Numerous television programs, ranging from noontime variety shows to primetime newscasts and late night news documentaries, paid tribute to Magalona.

He had been slated to appear as a special surprise guest at the Eraserheads' "the Final Set" reunion concert on March 7, 2009. Since he died the day before, the band instead dedicated the concert to Magalona. Buendia rapped the 22-bar portion in "Superproxy" which Magalona wrote, and the concert's penultimate song was the reprise of "Kaleidoscope World."

Magalona was cremated before daybreak on March 11, 2009. Hours later, his ashes were laid to rest at the Loyola Memorial Park in Marikina, causing traffic to stall in the Marikina Riverbanks area near the park as fans and numerous people from the entertainment industry joined the convoy. The Philippine Army rendered military honors to Magalona in recognition of his patriotism and service as a sergeant in the reserves. His widow, Pia, received the flag draped on his coffin.

Post-death crisis

The Magalona family was also firm against any attempts to capitalize on FrancisM's death and persona. On March 17, 2009, a group of Filipino expatriates in Dubai, UAE and Saudi Arabia, announced plans to hold tribute concerts where performers will sing his songs, with the proceeds supposedly going to a foundation set up in his honor and to the Philippine Red Cross. Pia and Maxene later came out and denounced the organizers, saying that neither concert had the family's blessings and the foundation did not exist. They particularly admonished the concert organizers for using the Red Cross to attract attendees. Pia also asked the public not to patronize sellers of fake FMCC goods, which started to appear within days of Magalona's death. Their house had been broken into a number of times, the apparent main targets being Magalona's personal items, along with his children's belongings. One of the stolen items was a laptop computer on which unpublished FMCC designs were stored.

In popular culture
Magalona would ultimately be cited not just the "King of Philippine Rap" but also "The Father of Pinoy Hip Hop". Magalona's contributions to the genre have been featured in several international hip hop publications including the All Music Guide to Hip-Hop: The Definitive Guide to Rap and Hip-Hop (2003) published by Backbeat Books; as well as the May 2004 issue of the U.S.-based publication The Source. He was also given the Pioneer Hall of Fame Award by Empire Entertainment at the 1st Annual Philippine Hip-Hop Music Awards in 2005.

Magalona was the recipient of the MTV Pilipinas Video Music Awards Generations Award in 2006 "in recognition of his career that has spanned decades and broken boundaries, and for his music which continues to inspire generations of artists and music fans both here and abroad." He was the second person so honored, the first having been singer Gary Valenciano at the 2005 rites.

On March 18, 2009, the Philippine Government – through the efforts of the National Commission for Culture and the Arts—recognized Magalona with by awarding him a posthumous Presidential Medal of Merit. The award's citation noted that it had been given "for his musical and artistic brilliance, his deep faith in the Filipino and his sense of national pride that continue to inspire us."

Several supporters of Magalona launched an online petition to award him, the Order of National Artist, which is the highest recognition for Philippine artists. However, nominations for the National Artist award will have to be done after three years as nominations for the order are closed. His daughter Maxene has indicated that she intends to continue Magalona's projects, including his The Sickos Project album with Buendia, and a documentary about his battle with cancer. The young actress stated: "We will coordinate with the people he had been working with, [...] I understand that Papa is a big part of history."

Magalona was given a tribute during a segment at the 2019 Southeast Asian Games opening ceremony at the Philippine Arena, where three of his songs being rendered by his son Elmo Magalona, who sang "Man From Manila", Iñigo Pascual, who gave a rendition of "Mga Kababayan", and KZ Tandingan, who sang "Tayo'y Mga Pinoy". The said segment in the ceremony showcased the energy of the Filipino people.

Discography

Albums
OctoArts International (now PolyEast Records)
1989: Francis M. (Extended of Loving You)
1990: Yo!
1990: Mga Kababayan (E.P. Dance Remix)
1990: Gotta Let 'Cha Know (E.P.)
1991: Man from Manila (E.P. Dance Remix)
1992: Rap Is FrancisM
1993: Meron Akong Ano!
1997: Francis M. - OPM Timeless Collection (Gold Series 2)
2001: The Story of Francis M. - (The Ultimate OPM Collection)

BMG Records (Pilipinas), Inc. (now Sony Music Philippines)
1995: FreeMan
1996: Happy Battle
1998: The Oddventures of Mr. Cool
1999: Interscholastic
2000: FreeMan 2
2002: The Best of Francis M
2003: Rap Public of The Philippines, Vol - 1 (with Andrew E., Michael V., Crazy as Pinoy and the other rap artists)
2005: Rap Public of the Philippines, Vol - 2 (with Loonie, Crazy as Pinoy, Pikaso, Gloc-9 and the other rap artists)
2005: Ultraelectromagneticjam!: The Music of the Eraserheads
2010: In Love and War (a.k.a. ILAW, originally The Sickos Project) (with Ely Buendia, Hilera, Hardware Syndrome and other artists; released posthumously)

Independent
2008: F Word

Singles
"Loving You" (with Pia Arroyo), his debut single
"My Only Love" (1989)
"Mga Kababayan" (1990)
"Ito ang Gusto Ko" (1993, theme from Royal Tru Orange Soda)
"Kaleidoscope World" (1995)
"Pikon" (1996)
"Kabataan Para Sa Kinabukasan" (1996)
"Saranggola ni Pepe" (with Andrew E.) (2000)
"Here We Go Part 2" (with Dongalo Wreckords, Andrew E. and Carlos Agassi) (2004)
"Pambihira Ka" (2004)
"Lando" (2005, featuring Gloc9)
"Superproxy" (2005, a cover from Eraserheads feat. Ely Buendia)
"Bagsakan" (2007, featuring Parokya Ni Edgar & Gloc9)
"Higante" (2010, featuring Ely Buendia)

Filmography

Film
Bagets 2 (1984) as Ponce
Doctor, Doctor, We Are Sick (1985)
Mga Kuwento ni Lola Basyang (1985)
Okleng Tokleng (1986)
Bukas ng Sabado agi Buka sa Sabitan (1986)
Ninja Kids (1986) as Tone
Family Tree (1987) as Edwin
Kung Aagawin Mo ang Lahat sa Akin (1987)
Action Is Not Missing (1987)
Hati Tayo sa Magdamag (1988) – Arthur
Ang Pumatay ng Dahil sa Iyo (1989)
Gumapang Ka sa Lusak (aka Dirty Affair) (1990)
Iputok Mo... Dadapa Ako! (Hard to Die) (1990)
Pangako ng Puso (1991)
Joey Boy Munti, 15 Anyos Ka sa Muntinlupa (1991)
Ano Ba 'Yan (1992) – Kiko
Boboy Salonga: Batang Tondo (1992)
Estribo Gang: The Jinggoy Sese Story (1992) – Elmer
Totoy Buang: Mad Killer ng Maynila (1992) – DJ
Engkanto (1992) as Uban
Mama's Boys (1993)
Ano Ba 'Yan 2 (1993) – Kiko
Tong-its (1995)
Saranggola ni Pepe at Juan (1999) as Juan San Miguel/Juan Tamad
Kwentong Kayumanggi (2002) as Narrator – Hundreds Island and the Bravery of Datu Mabiskeg
Anak ni Brocka (2005, his last movie)

Television
Vilma in Person (co-host)
Loveli Ness (ABS-CBN & IBC) (1987-1990) (co-host)
U. F. O. (Urbana, Felisa & Others)
Plaza 1899
Young Love, Sweet Love (RPN)
Mother Studio Presents
The Maricel Drama Special (ABS-CBN) (1993)
The Sharon Cuneta Show (IBC & ABS-CBN) (1987-1992)
Regal Romance (GMA Network)
Lovingly Yours, Helen (1986–1996)
That's Entertainment
Channel V: Sigaw Manila (1995)
Maalaala Mo Kaya (1995)
Kamada (1997)
Music Bureau (ABC)
GMA Supershow
Mikee
Dear Mikee
Chibugan Na! (RPN)
Spotlight Drama Specials
Rap 13 (IBC)
SOP (GMA Network)
GMA Telecine Specials
MTV's Life's a Beach
MTV Talk
GMA Love Stories
GMA Mini Series
The Manager: Eat Bulaga Special (2003)
Astigmatism (2004) as Victim 1
Show Ko 'to (2004)
Myx Live (2005)
Bubble Gang (2005)
Fam Jam (QTV, 2005–2006)
True Love: Eat Bulaga Special (2005)
A Telefantastic Christmas: The GMA All-Star Special (2005)
Maynila (2008)
Eat Bulaga! (GMA, 1997-2009; his death, final TV show)
Balikbayan (QTV, 2009)
Student Canteen (1984-1986)
Philippine Idol (ABC "now TV5", 2006) "Judge"
MTV Pilipinas Music Video Award 2006

Awards and nominations

References

External links
a Free Mind, Francis Magalona's official website
FrancisM's Happy Battle, blog by Magalona and wife Pia focusing on his battle with leukemia
Francis Magalona at PinoyRap.com

1964 births
2009 deaths
Burials at the Loyola Memorial Park
Deaths from cancer in the Philippines
Deaths from leukemia
Filipino male child actors
20th-century Filipino male singers
Filipino male television actors
Filipino rappers
Filipino Roman Catholics
Francis
Male actors from Metro Manila
Musicians from Metro Manila
People from Manila
Rap rock musicians
Recipients of the Presidential Medal of Merit (Philippines)
San Beda University alumni
Sony Music Philippines artists
Filipino television variety show hosts
That's Entertainment (Philippine TV series)
That's Entertainment Monday Group Members
GMA Network personalities
ABS-CBN personalities
VJs (media personalities)